
This is a list of tunnels documented by the Historic American Engineering Record in the U.S. state of Virginia.

Tunnels

See also
List of bridges documented by the Historic American Engineering Record in Virginia

References

List
List
Virginia
Tunnels, HAER
Tunnels, HAER